Tyrants and Wraiths is an EP by Austrian melodic death metal band Hollenthon, released by Napalm Records in 2009. It features bonus videos of "On the Wings of a Dove" and "Ars Moriendi" live at Graspop Metal Meeting.

Track listing 
All songs written and arranged by Hollenthon. Lyrics by Elena Schirenc
 "Tyrants and Wraiths" – 5:26
 "Innocent Sin" – 4:22
 "Deathly Dirges" – 5:28
 "Of Hollow Men" – 7:30

Personnel
 Martin Schirenc - Guitar, Vocals
 Martin Arzberger - Guitar
 Gregor Marboe -  Bass, Vocals
 Mike Gröge - Drums
Martin Schirenc - producer, recording. engineer, mixing

Hollenthon albums
2009 albums
Napalm Records EPs